Aphomia monochroa is a species of snout moth in the genus Aphomia. It was described by George Hampson in 1912 and is known from Sri Lanka and India.

References

Moths described in 1912
Tirathabini
Moths of Sri Lanka
Moths of Asia